Evarcha idanrensis is a jumping spider that lives in Nigeria.

References

Endemic fauna of Nigeria
Salticidae
Fauna of Nigeria
Spiders of Africa
Spiders described in 2011